William Anderson (died 14 January 1892) was a New Zealand rugby union player and a member of the 1888–89 New Zealand Native football team that toured Britain, Ireland, Australia and New Zealand in 1888 and 1889.

He was a forward, and played for the Hokianga club. He died at Kiri Kiri near Thames.

References  
 

Year of birth missing
1892 deaths
New Zealand rugby union players
New Zealand Māori rugby union players